The Conscious Seed of Light is the first studio album by Pennsylvania death metal band Rivers of Nihil. The album was released on October 15, 2013 via Metal Blade Records. It is the first album in the band's tetralogy based around the four seasons; it represents spring.

Background and promotion
On December 10, 2012, Metal Blade Records announced that they'd signed Rivers of Nihil to a record deal, and released a demo for the song "Rain Eater". The label also announced that the band would be working with Erik Rutan of Hate Eternal and Morbid Angel to record their first studio album at Mana Recording Studios in Tampa, Florida.

Album artwork was created by Dan Seagrave, who would handle the artwork on the band's next three albums as well. Dan Seagrave explained, "For this artwork I was thinking about Roman ruins, as well as Egyptian and Aztec culture. I had visited Pompei and tried to use the feeling of ancient lost history in this artwork."

The version of "Rain Eater" that appears on this album was uploaded on YouTube on August 20, 2013. This was followed in September 2013 by singles "Mechanical Trees" and "Soil & Seed".

In promotion of the album, the band released three more singles with their own videos: a lyric video for "A Fertile Altar", a play-through video for "Airless", and a music video for "Birth of the Omnisavior".

Track listing

Personnel
Production and performance credits are adapted from the album liner notes.

Rivers of Nihil
 Jake Dieffenbach – lead vocals
 Brody Uttley – lead guitar
 Adam Biggs – bass, backing vocals
 Jon Kunz – rhythm guitar
 Ron Nelson – drums

Production
 Dan Seagrave – artwork
 Brian Elliott – additional engineering
 Alan Douches – mastering
 Adrian Perez – photography
 Erik Rutan – production, engineering, mixing

References

2013 albums
Metal Blade Records albums
Rivers of Nihil albums